Tomáš Mica (born 25 May 1983 in Brno) is a Czech association footballer.

References

External links

1983 births
Living people
Czech footballers
Czech Republic youth international footballers
Czech expatriate footballers
Expatriate footballers in Switzerland
Expatriate footballers in Italy
Expatriate footballers in Bulgaria
Czech First League players
1. FC Slovácko players
Neftochimic Burgas players
FC Wil players
FC La Chaux-de-Fonds players
First Professional Football League (Bulgaria) players
Association football forwards
Footballers from Brno
Czech expatriate sportspeople in Bulgaria